Actian is a computer software company headquartered in Sunnyvale, California that provides data management software. In July 2018, Actian was acquired by HCL Technologies and Sumeru Equity Partners for $330 million. On December 31, 2021, HCL Technologies became the sole owner of Actian.      

Actian was founded in 2005, as a private equity funded spin-out of the Ingres product line from Computer Associates, and developed data management and integration technologies, including Vectorwise, Btrieve/Pervasive PSQL, and the Ingres database.

History

Ingres
Ingres was developed at the University of California, Berkeley and commercialized by Relational Technology Inc. After a course of name changes and acquisitions, including VectorWise BV, Versant, Pervasive, and ParAccel, Actian came into existence as a multinational software firm.

Relational Technology, Incorporated (RTI), was founded in 1980 by Michael Stonebraker and Eugene Wong, and professor Lawrence A. Rowe to commercialize Ingres.
Its initial public offering was held in May 1988 to raise $28 million.
By this time, RTI had competition in the database management system (DBMS) market, including Oracle Corporation (which had started with the similar name Relational Software Incorporated), Informix Corporation, and Sybase, but was one of the largest DBMS companies.
RTI was renamed Ingres Corporation late in 1989.

ASK Computer Systems announced in September 1990 a deal in which ASK would acquire Ingres, funded partially by investments from Hewlett-Packard and Electronic Data Systems.
The deal met resistance from a shareholder, but did complete by November 1990.

OpenROAD
OpenROAD was the small-machine offering of the Ingres database. The suite included applications-by-forms (ABF), an early 4GL computer programming language. It provided an ASCII form painter, which automatically bound form fields to a database using ABF, a programming language, with embedded SQL, simplifying the task of making a "CRUD" application for textual data. ABF source code was interpreted into a 3GL language (C or COBOL), which is then compiled so snippets of the native language may be directly embedded in the ABF code. ABF was deprecated by OpenROAD in the early nineties.

Several other database vendors marketed comparable 4GLs at around the same time, such as Pick System Builder, Clipper, and DBASE III. ABF was deprecated by the OpenROAD business unit in the early nineties.

Relation to Computer Associates
Computer Associates (CA) acquired the ASK Group in 1994. Despite a loyal customer base, CA failed to develop the technology much further.

Ingres Corporation was spun out of CA as a separate private company in November 2005, with private equity firm Garnett & Helfrich Capital as largest shareholder. Terry Garnett served as interim chief executive, and CA retained a 25% interest.
In July 2006, Roger Burkhardt became president.
He promoted open source software, and helped form Open Source for America in 2009.

Ingres announced they had acquired the VectorWise technology in 2010, which had spun out from the Centrum Wiskunde & Informatica (CWI, the Dutch National Research Institute for Mathematics and Computer Science) in 2008. In November 2010, Garnett & Helfrich Capital acquired the last 20% of equity in Ingres Corporation that it did not already own.
In July 2011, Steve Shine became chief executive.

Vectorwise
Vectorwise originated from the X100 research project carried out within the Centrum Wiskunde & Informatica (CWI, the Dutch National Research Institute for Mathematics and Computer Science) between 2003 and 2008.
It was spun off as a start-up company in 2008, and acquired by Ingres Corporation in 2011.
It was released as a commercial product in June, 2010, initially for 64-bit Linux platform, and later also for Windows.
Starting from 3.5 release in April 2014, the product name was shortened to "Vector".
In June 2014, Actian Vortex was announced - clustered MPP version of Vector, working in Hadoop with storage in HDFS. Actian Vortex was later renamed to Actian Vector in Hadoop. Actian Vector (formerly known as VectorWise) is an SQL relational database management system designed for high performance in analytical database applications. In turn, Actian Vector became the core engine in Actian Avalanche.

Pervasive
Pervasive Software was a company that developed software including database management systems and extract, transform and load tools. Pervasive PSQL relational database management system was its primary data storage product. In December 2003 Pervasive acquired Data Junction Corporation, a privately held company with headquarters also in Austin which produced data and application integration tools renamed Pervasive Data Integrator and later DataConnect, for about US$51.7 million in cash and stock shares.
In 2013, Pervasive Software was acquired by Actian Corporation for $161.9 million, increased from an initial offer of $154 million.

Actian
In September 2011, Ingres changed its name to Actian, using the marketing phrase "action apps". CEO Steve Shine said the new focus would be on lower-cost sales for its cloud action platform.
In late 2012, after rejecting an offer by Unicom Systems, Versant Corporation announced it agreed to be acquired by Actian, promoted using the term big data. It closed in December 2012 for an estimated $37 million.

ParAccel was acquired by Actian in April 2013.
Analysts expected Actian to market ParAccel for larger databases, and VectorWise for moderately sized applications. In February 2014, Forbes.com listed Actian at #5 in its "Top 10 Big Data Pure-Plays 2014" citing $138 million in Actian revenue for 2013.

In August, 2016, it was reported that Actian had phased out its products promoted for big data, including the former ParAccel, VectorWise, and DataFlow technology. On November 1, 2016, Shine was replaced as chief executive by Rohit De Souza. A new chief financial officer and executive chairman were also appointed.

In April, 2017, several products were renamed, including the combination of Ingres and the former Vector product into one product. Actian X, with new features.

Actian released a product called Avalanche in March 2019 for use on the Amazon Web Services (AWS) cloud.

Lewis Black (previously chief financial officer) took over as CEO in 2020.

References

External links
 Actian Corporation

Software companies based in the San Francisco Bay Area
Companies based in Palo Alto, California
Software companies established in 1980
1980s initial public offerings
2018 mergers and acquisitions
Software companies of the United States
1990 mergers and acquisitions